The 35th District of the Iowa House of Representatives in the state of Iowa.

Current elected officials
Ako Abdul-Samad is the representative currently representing the district.

Past representatives
The district has previously been represented by:
 Harold O. Fischer, 1971–1973
 Donald L. Lippold, 1973–1975
 Diane Brandt, 1975–1983
 Mike Connolly, 1983–1990
 Pat Murphy, 1990–1993
 Pam Jochum, 1993–2003
 Kraig Paulsen, 2003–2013
 Ako Abdul-Samad, 2013–present

References

035